Ficus krukovii is a species of plant in the family Moraceae. It is found in Bolivia, Brazil, and Venezuela.

References

krukovii
Least concern plants
Taxonomy articles created by Polbot